Anders Berntsen Mol (born 2 July 1997) is a Norwegian beach volleyball player. He won the gold medal at the 2020 Olympics in Tokyo.

Beach career 
Mol learned to play beach volleyball as a teenager. His parents introduced him to the sport. Together with Martin Olimstad he competed at the U18 European Championships in Molodetscho. Together with his cousin Mathias Berntsen Mol competed in multiple national and international tournaments between 2014 and 2017. Berntsen/ Mol won the U20 European Championships 2015 in Larnaka and were U22 Vice European Champions in 2017. Further highlights of the two cousins was a 9th place at a 5-star- event of the world series in Porec and a third place at a 2-star-event in Espinho. 2016 Mol again won the U20 European Championship in Atlanta together with Alexander Sorum. Since end of 2016 Mol plays together with Alexanders brother, Christian Sorum, who previously played with Anders own brother, Hendrik. Together with Christian, Mol landed a 5th place at the FIVB-Major in Klagenfurt and won the U22 European Championship in Thessaloniki. 2017 Mol/ Sorum landed a 9th place at the FIVB 5 star tournament in Gstaad, won the CEV Masters in Ljubljana and landed a 5th place at the European Championship in Jurmala. Besides, Mol was “best Newcomer” on the world tour 2017. 2018 Mol/ Sorum landed in 5th place at the 4-star tournament in Den Haag. There followed many more top 10 placings, including a 5th place in Xiamen, a second place in Itapema, a 5th place in Espinho and the win in Gstaad. In July, Mol/ Sorum became European Champions in the Netherlands. Then they also won the 5-star tournament in Vienna and climbed to the top of the world ranking after winning 19 times in a row. They even won the World Tour Final in Hamburg. With that win the duo landed their forth FIVB World Tour gold medal in a row and earned them the highest ever prize money in the history of beach volleyball, taking home 150,000 $ in total. Mol finished the 2018/2017 season with four FIVB awards, Best Blocker, Best Offensive Player, Most Outstanding Player and Most Improved.

The duo was also dominating the world tour season 2018/19. They won 4-star tournaments in Las Vegas, Itapema, Jinjiang, Ostrava und landed a second place in Warsaw. At the world championship in Hamburg they lost in the semifinal against the German team Thole/ Wickler landed a third place in the end. The following tournaments in Gstaad, Tokyo, and Vienna they claimed gold. At the European Championship in Moscow Mol/Sorum defended their title. At the World Tour Finals in Rome Mol/Sorum won a bronze medal. Mol finished the 2019/2018 year with another four FIVB awards, Best Blocker, Best Setter, Best Attacker and Most Outstanding Player. Mol/Sorum also won the FIVB Most Outstanding Team.

In 2020, Mol/Sorum once again defended their European Championship title winning gold in Jurmala, Latvia. This win made them the third team in history to win a European Championship three years in a row. At 23 and 24, respectively they are the youngest team to achieve this feat.

At the 2020 Tokyo Olympics, the pair won gold medals, beating Russians Viacheslav Krasilnikov and Oleg Stoyanovskiy in the final.

They won gold at the 2021 European Championship in Vienna, becoming the first team to win it four times and the first team to win four consecutive times.

Indoor career 
In 2016, Mol also played indoors in the Norwegian U20 national team as an outside hitter. In the 2016/17 season he became Belgian vice champion and also played in the Champions League.

In 2019 Mol signed a temporary contract with the club Førde volleyballKlubb. In 2020 he won the Norwegian Championship with the club before going back to beach volleyball.

Private life 
Mols parents Merita Berntsen and Kåre Mol are former Volleyball/ Beach Volleyball Champions and now coaches. His four siblings are also active in volleyball and beach volleyball today. One of his brothers, Hendrik Mol, initially played with Anders' future partner Christian Sorum. The Mol brothers and Sorum brothers met while they all attended the volleyball-focused educational program ToppVolley Norge at Sauda Videregående, in Ryfylke.

References

External links
 
 
 
 Anders Berntsen Mol at RedBull.com
 
 
 

1997 births
Living people
Norwegian beach volleyball players
People from Stord
Beach volleyball players at the 2020 Summer Olympics
Beach volleyball players at the 2014 Summer Youth Olympics
Olympic gold medalists for Norway
Medalists at the 2020 Summer Olympics
Olympic medalists in beach volleyball
Olympic beach volleyball players of Norway
Sportspeople from Vestland
21st-century Norwegian people